Percival Wheritt "Perry" Werden (July 21, 1865 – January 9, 1934) was an American baseball player. He was a first baseman for the St. Louis Maroons (1884), Washington Nationals (1888), Toledo Maumees (1890), Baltimore Orioles (1891), St. Louis Browns (1892–1893) and Louisville Colonels (1897).

Career
Werden played as a pitcher in 1884 where he had a 12–1 win–loss record (leading the Union Association in winning percentage at .923), 16 games, 16 games started, 12 complete games, 1 shutout,  innings pitched, 113 hits allowed, 61 runs allowed, 31 earned runs allowed, 1 home run allowed, 22 walks allowed, 51 strikeouts and a 1.97 ERA. During this season, he helped the Maroons win the first and only Union Association pennant.

An arm injury moved Werden to first base and in 7 seasons he played in 693 games, 2,740 at bats, 444 runs, 773 hits, 109 doubles, 87 triples, 26 home runs, 439 RBI, 150 stolen bases, 281 walks, .282 batting average, .359 on-base percentage, .414 slugging percentage, 1,134 total bases and 5 sacrifice hits.

Werden had a remarkable minor league career. For the Minneapolis Millers of the Western League in 1894, he hit .417 with 42 home runs. The next season, he improved in both categories, hitting .428 with 45 home runs. These were astounding home run totals for the time (helped by the short outfield fence distance at their home field): for example, Sam Thompson led the National League in home runs with 18 in 1895. No one would hit more than 29 until Babe Ruth hit 54 in 1920. Werden retired with a career .341 batting average with five home run titles in the minor leagues.

He died in Minneapolis, Minnesota at the age of 68, and was buried at Bellefontaine Cemetery in St. Louis.

See also
List of Major League Baseball annual triples leaders

Sources

1865 births
1934 deaths
Baseball players from St. Louis
Major League Baseball first basemen
Washington Nationals (1886–1889) players
Baltimore Orioles (AA) players
St. Louis Maroons players
Toledo Maumees players
St. Louis Browns (NL) players
Louisville Colonels players
Memphis Reds players
Lincoln Tree Planters players
Des Moines Hawkeyes players
Topeka Golden Giants players
New Orleans Pelicans (baseball) players
Toledo Black Pirates players
Minneapolis Millers (baseball) players
St. Paul Saints (Western League) players
Memphis Egyptians players
Fargo (minor league baseball) players
Hattiesburg Tar Heels players
Vicksburg Hill Billies players
Indianapolis Indians players
Minnesota Golden Gophers baseball coaches
Minor league baseball managers
19th-century baseball players